Redlands is a Grade II listed country house estate in West Wittering, West Sussex, owned by The Rolling Stones' Keith Richards.

In his autobiography, Richards describes purchasing the property in 1966:
We just spoke to each other the minute we saw each other. A thatched house, quite small, surrounded by a moat. I drove up there by mistake...I took a wrong turn and turned into Redlands. This guy walked out, very nice guy, and said, yeah? And I said, oh sorry, we've come to the wrong turning. He said, yes, you want to go Fishbourne way, and he said, are you looking for a house to buy? He was very pukka, an ex-commodore of the Royal Navy. And I said yes.

Redlands was the scene of the famous February 1967 police raid, the subsequent arrest of Richards and Mick Jagger and prison sentences for Jagger and Robert Fraser for drugs possession.

References

  

Buildings and structures in West Sussex
Grade II listed buildings in West Sussex